Thomson is a village along Illinois Route 84 near the Mississippi River in Carroll County, Illinois, United States. The population was 590 at the 2010 census, up from 559 at the 2000 census.  Just north of the village is the United States Penitentiary, Thomson, a mostly-unused former state prison, purchased by the Federal Bureau of Prisons in 2012. Currently USP Thomson houses over 100 low-security inmates as it remodels to federal maximum-security standards.

Thomson is known for wonderful watermelons, and it has the nickname "Melon Capital of the World."

Geography

Demographics

As of the 2020 census there were 1,610 people, 190 households, and 127 families residing in the village. The racial makeup of the village was 58.45% White, 36.65% African American, 2.11% Native American, 0.43% Asian, 0.12% from other races, and 2.24% from two or more races. Hispanic or Latino of any race were 12.55% of the population.

There were 190 households, out of which 16.84% had children under the age of 18 living with them, 52.63% were married couples living together, 14.21% had a female householder with no husband present, and 33.16% were non-families. 30.00% of all households were made up of individuals, and 14.74% had someone living alone who was 65 years of age or older. The average household size was 2.35 and the average family size was 1.94.

The village's age distribution consisted of 12.2% under the age of 18, 11.9% from 18 to 24, 20.3% from 25 to 44, 27.2% from 45 to 64, and 28.5% who were 65 years of age or older. The median age was 52.9 years. For every 100 females, there were 88.3 males. For every 100 females age 18 and over, there were 85.1 males.

The median income for a household in the village was $51,071, and the median income for a family was $62,031. Males had a median income of $27,330 versus $25,250 for females. The per capita income for the village was $30,156. About 4.7% of families and 11.1% of the population were below the poverty line, including 31.1% of those under age 18 and 3.8% of those age 65 or over.

History

Prison

The United States Penitentiary, Thomson (formerly Thomson Correctional Center) was opened in 2001, but as of 2009 has never had a prisoner in its main, 1600-bed maximum-security unit; the only prison population has been in the 200-bed minimum-security unit, which was populated in 2006 and averages about 150 prisoners. The minimum security unit has an annual budget of $7 million. State budget constraints, as well as labor union opposition to closing other state prisons, prevented the maximum-security prison from opening.

In 2008, Illinois Governor Rod Blagojevich proposed closing the state prison in Pontiac, Illinois and opening the Thomson maximum-security unit instead. However, Blagojevich was subsequently arrested on December 9, 2008, and removed from office. His replacement, Governor Pat Quinn cancelled plans to close the Pontiac prison in March 2009, leaving Thomson unused.

In 2009 the United States government announced that prisoners at the Guantanamo Bay detention camp would be moved to the prison in Thomson. CNN stated that before the decision was announced, many people in the town wanted the Guantanamo prisoners to be housed there so the town could get economic benefits.

On December 15, 2009, President Barack Obama ordered the federal government to proceed with acquisition of the underutilized state prison in Thomson to be the new home for a limited number of terror suspects held at Guantanamo Bay, Cuba. The facility was also be used as a Bureau of Prisons facility to house other federal inmates. 
In response to the 2009 presidential order, the American Federation of State County and Municipal Employees (AFSCME), which represents 13,000 Illinois prison staff, argued that rather than turn the maximum-security unit over to the Federal government, it should be used to relieve overcrowding in other Illinois prisons. AFSCME claims that the other facilities were designed for 32,000 prisoners, but currently house 45,000. Subsequent Congressional banning of federal expenditures for imprisoning in the United States of terror suspects held at Guantanamo Bay, Cuba, stopped the Obama plans regarding those terror suspects, even though the federal government announced on October 2, 2012 that the acquisition of Thomson is going forward.

References

External links

Village of Thomson
Visit Thomson

Villages in Carroll County, Illinois
Villages in Illinois
Illinois populated places on the Mississippi River